Buzz! is a series of video games originated by Sleepydog Ltd., developed by Relentless Software and published by Sony Computer Entertainment for the PlayStation 2, PlayStation 3 and PlayStation Portable consoles. They are quiz games that see the players answering trivia questions while competing in the fictional game show, Buzz!. Created specifically with multi-player party gaming in mind, the series launched in October 2005 and to date comprises 18 games; including 13 in the Buzz! series and five Buzz! Junior titles. The series made the transition to the PlayStation 3 with Buzz!: Quiz TV in 2008. The sixteenth game in the series Buzz!: Brain of the UK was released in March 2009.  The latest Buzz! game is Buzz!: The Ultimate Music Quiz which was released in October 2010.

In 2006 the second game in the Buzz series, Buzz!: The BIG Quiz, won the BAFTA award for Best Casual and Social game. Buzz!: Quiz TV has been nominated in the Best Social Game and Best Multiplayer Game categories for the 2009 BAFTA video game awards. The series has sold over 10 million copies.

As with most TV quiz shows the winner of the game is the player with the most points. The show uses a multi-round format with most games in the series featuring eight individual rounds. The exact rounds vary from game-to-game and more information about the rounds can be found in the individual articles. Each game is hosted by the titular Buzz (voiced by Jason Donovan in the English versions)

The games are played with buzzers – a set of four simple controllers that consist of four coloured answer buttons and a red buzzer. These are intended to replicate the buzzers often seen on TV quiz shows. The buzzers plug into a USB port and the game allows use of either one or two sets of buzzers allowing up to eight players in certain games. The games are usually marketed in two versions, a pack containing both game and buzzers for new purchasers or a game only version for players who already own a set of buzzers.

In January 2008 California-based Buzztime Entertainment filed a legal suit, in the Southern District of California, against Sony Computer Entertainment Europe alleging that Sony had violated several of its trademarks. The suit accused Sony of a "malicious, fraudulent, knowing, wilful, and deliberate" violation of its trademarks. In the suit Buzztime is seeking the recall and destruction of all infringing products and is asking the court for actual damages, punitive damages, legal fees and an order to the US Patent and Trademark Office not to register Sony's  pending Buzz trademarks. The case was eventually settled out of court in favour of Sony.

Buzz! series 

The series was launched in October 2005 with Buzz!: The Music Quiz, which was followed by a general knowledge version Buzz!: The BIG Quiz. The alternation between specialist subject and general knowledge continued for the next three games in the series; the sports based Buzz!: The Sports Quiz was followed by another general knowledge edition, Buzz!: The Mega Quiz, and then another single subject edition based around films, Buzz!: The Hollywood Quiz. The sequence was broken with the March 2008 release of Buzz!: The Pop Quiz. Buzz!: Quiz TV is a general knowledge quiz but allows players the option of quizzes on a single specific subject. Buzz!: Master Quiz is a general knowledge quiz with the addition of single subject rounds.  In 2009 Buzz!: Quiz World, expanded on Quiz TV by adding profiles to remember player's character & buzzer sounds, if players won or lost the previous game and call them by name.  Quiz World includes both a PS3 & PSP version of the game.  Buzz!: Quiz Player is a free downloadable game, and is essentially a Quiz World demo.  Quiz Player can also play the PS3 downloadable quiz packs, and can be played with the buzzers or with a controller.

Buzz! Junior series 

In October 2006 a spin-off series of games designed for children started with the release of Buzz! Junior: Jungle Party with 40 mini games (but 25 in The United States version). The second game, Buzz! Junior: Robo Jam, was released in May 2007, was the first game to be created by Cohort Studios for both PlayStation 2 & PlayStation 3, and has 25 mini games ( but 24 in North America). Buzz! Junior: Robo Jam uses robots as players. Then, a third, Buzz! Junior: Monster Rumble was released in November 2007 and has 25 mini games. The fourth game in the series, Buzz! Junior: Dino Den, is based around dinosaurs and was the second Buzz game to be developed by Cohort Studios and released in February 2008. The fifth Buzz! Junior game, Buzz! Junior: Ace Racers, again developed by Cohort Studios, was released in October 2008. Buzz! Junior: Ace Racers is a racing game where players race cars, boats and planes using their Buzz! buzzer.
All the games in the Buzz! Junior series have been developed by Magenta Software, FreeStyleGames, and Cohort Studios.

Buzz! buzzers 

The Buzz! Buzzer is a special controller designed specifically for the Buzz! game series. The controller handset has a large red buzzer button and four smaller coloured buttons for selecting the answer from the on-screen options. The buzzer set is a USB device, and connects to the USB ports on the PlayStation 2 and PlayStation 3.

Buzz!: Quiz TV saw the release of a wireless version of the buzzers. They connect to the PS2 or PS3 system via a USB dongle. Each dongle can support up to 4 wireless buzzers so this means another dongle is required for 8 player play with 8 wireless buzzers. The wireless buzzers can be used with both the PlayStation 2 and PlayStation 3 and all previous Buzz! games.

Games

Buzz! series

Buzz! Junior series

Other versions 

On 24 November 2006, Eidos released Who Wants to be a Millionaire – Party Edition. This was the first third party game to support the use of Buzz! buzzers. The game features a single player game closely modelled on the original UK version of the TV show and a multi-player version with various modes like Multi-Millionaire where players take it in turns to answer questions with elimination the penalty for a wrong answer the winner being the last player left standing. Millionaire Party allows players to steal questions from rivals.

On 7 November 2008, Disney Interactive Studios released Disney Think Fast  for the PlayStation 2. The game came in a box with four Buzz controllers without the Buzz branding.

PlayStation Home 
Relentless Software released a Buzz! themed space for the PlayStation 3's online social gaming network, PlayStation Home in the European and North American versions. The space is called "Buzz!: HQ". Buzz!: HQ is a lounge with seats for the user's avatars and the lounge is styled like a VIP room where outside of the doors, there is a red carpet with people standing on both sides and flashing cameras. The red carpeted area is not accessible. In the Buzz!: HQ lounge, there is an option called "Enter Buzz!: Studio" that takes users to "Buzz!: Studio". Buzz!: Studio is a "64 Player Buzz! Quizzing" with rewards. There are three different T-shirts users can win for their avatars; a Single Win T-shirt, a 25 Correct Questions T-shirt, and a 100 Correct Questions T-shirt. There are four categories to choose from which change each game and a series of eight questions for each category. To answer the question correctly, the user must stand on the colored area that represents the correct answer. The original release date was 4 June 2009. Due to some technical problems of the Buzz!: Studio, the space was removed for fixing. The relaunch of the space happened on 16 July 2009. Another unique feature about the space is that the quizzes used for Buzz!: Studio are quizzes made by PlayStation Network users who have submitted their quiz via the MyBuzz! website.

As of 10 September  2009, Buzz!: Quiz TV fully supports game launching. Game launching is a feature that allows users to set up multi-player games in Home and launch directly into the game from Home. Buzz!: Quiz World supports PlayStation Home rewards by winning the quiz rounds in the game.

From 27 August 2009 to 24 September 2009, an event for Buzz! took place in a special PlayStation Events Space. The event was called the "Buzz! Tomato Challenge" and used the space, Events Landing. Exclusive footage from the Buzz! World Championships grand final at La Tomatina festival in Spain was shown during the event. Users were able to take part in a virtual version of the real world event via the Buzz! Tomato Challenge pod in the re-dressed Events Landing. Users threw tomatoes at the enormous Buzz by answering quiz questions correctly. If they successfully hit Buzz ten times within the time limit, they were rewarded a Buzz! Tomato Head for their avatar. This event was only available to the European Home.

Cameos 
Pain – One of the downloadable add-on characters for the PS3 game Pain is Buzz, with 2 different costumes to wear in the game.

LittleBigPlanet – Buzz is an add-on costumes for the game's Sackboy character.  It features a Buzz skin (for his red suit), Buzz hair, Buzz glasses, and a Buzz tie.

PlayStation All-Stars Battle Royale – Buzz is featured in the PlayStation All-Stars Battle Royale level, Dreamscape, based on LittleBigPlanet which eventually gets invaded by Buzz!. As the level progresses Buzz appears standing in the background. Buzz occasionally asks questions about PlayStation Trivia with the four answers being split up and attached onto four platforms on the level on which players must stand to indicate their choice, an incorrect answer results in a punishment such as a Cream-pie being thrown at the incorrect players.

References

External links 

 Buzz! official site

 
Party video games
Sony Interactive Entertainment games
Video game franchises
Video games developed in the United Kingdom
Lua (programming language)-scripted video games
Video game franchises introduced in 2005